The Ching-kuo Memorial Hall is a memorial hall dedicated to former President of the Republic of China Chiang Ching-kuo located in Nangan Township, Lienchiang County, Taiwan.

History
After President Chiang Ching-kuo passed away on 13 January 1988, political and military chiefs in Lienchiang discussed the construction of memorial to commemorate the President. The construction of the memorial hall was completed in June 1994.

Architecture

The memorial hall is located in a 2-story building on a hill. It has a total area of around 100 hectares. It was constructed with blue tile and white wall style, taking reference from the Sun Yat-sen Mausoleum in Nanjing and Chiang Kai-shek Memorial Hall in Taipei. The front wall is decorated with a sculpture of President Chiang.

Exhibitions
The ground floor displays a bronze seated statue of Chiang Ching-kuo with his last testament, including mails. The upper floor displays photos during his visits to Lienchiang and his hand-written documents.

See also
 List of tourist attractions in Taiwan

References

1994 establishments in Taiwan
Buildings and structures completed in 1994
Buildings and structures in Lienchiang County
Chiang Ching-kuo
Monuments and memorials in Taiwan
Nangang Township